Team Felbermayr–Simplon Wels is a UCI Continental team founded in 2004. The team is based in Austria and participates in UCI Continental Circuits races.

Doping
In July 2017, it was announced by the UCI that Matija Kvasina had tested positive for an experimental drug known as Molidustat (BAY-85-3934), during two tests taken during the 2017 Flèche du Sud – a race in which he won. Molidustat represents a class of drugs that act on the same physiological pathways and enzyme cascades as those which are activated during altitude training. Oxygen deprivation has the effect of stimulating the body's production of erythropoietin (EPO) – Molidustat imitates this. Kvasina was subsequently kicked out of the 2017 Tour of Austria.

Team roster

Major wins

2006
Stage 4 Tour du Maroc, Klaus Steinkeller
2007
 Time Trial Championships, Rupert Probst
2011
Stage 1 Sibiu Cycling Tour, Team time trial
Stage 5 Sibiu Cycling Tour, Riccardo Zoidl
Tobago Cycling Classic, Riccardo Zoidl
2012
 Road Race Championships, Lukas Pöstlberger
 Time Trial Championships, Riccardo Zoidl
Overall Istrian Spring Trophy, Markus Eibegger
Stage 2, Markus Eibegger
Stage 3 Okolo Slovenska, Werner Riebenbauer
Stage 3 Oberösterreich Rundfahrt, Riccardo Zoidl
Stage 1 Tour of Szeklerland, Team time trial
2013
Overall UCI Europe Tour, Riccardo Zoidl
 Time Trial Championships, Matija Kvasina
 Road Race Championships, Riccardo Zoidl
Stage 3 Istrian Spring Trophy, Matej Marin
Overall Circuit des Ardennes, Riccardo Zoidl
Stage 2, Riccardo Zoidl
Overall Tour de Bretagne, Riccardo Zoidl
Stage 2, Riccardo Zoidl
Raiffeisen Grand Prix, Riccardo Zoidl
Overall Oberösterreich Rundfahrt, Riccardo Zoidl
Stages 2 & 3, Riccardo Zoidl
Overall Tour of Austria, Riccardo Zoidl
Stage 2 Sibiu Cycling Tour, Markus Eibegger
GP Kranj, Lukas Pöstlberger
Croatia–Slovenia, Riccardo Zoidl
Stage 3 Okolo Jižních Čech, Matija Kvasina
2014
Stage 2b Le Triptyque des Monts et Châteaux, Patrick Konrad
Overall Rhône-Alpes Isère Tour, Matija Kvasina
Overall Oberösterreich Rundfahrt, Patrick Konrad
Grand Prix Sarajevo, Matej Marin
2015
GP Laguna, Michael Gogl
GP Izola, Gregor Mühlberger
Trofeo Banca Popolare di Vicenza, Felix Großschartner
Raiffeisen Grand Prix, Gregor Mühlberger
Overall Oberösterreich Rundfahrt, Gregor Mühlberger
Stage 4, Gregor Mühlberger
 Time Trial Championships, Matija Kvasina
Stage 2 Giro della Regione Friuli Venezia Giulia, Felix Großschartner
2016
Stage 1 Istrian Spring Trophy, Markus Eibegger
Overall Tour d'Azerbaïdjan, Markus Eibegger
Stage 1 Rhône-Alpes Isère Tour, Daniel Schorn
Stage 3 Okolo Slovenska, Markus Eibegger
2017
Le Triptyque des Monts et Châteaux, Daniel Auer
Stage 4 Circuit des Ardennes, Riccardo Zoidl
Stage 3 Flèche du Sud, Riccardo Zoidl
Overall Oberösterreich Rundfahrt, Stephan Rabitsch 
Stage 1, Stephan Rabitsch 
2018
GP Adria Mobil, Filippo Fortin
Overall Rhône-Alpes Isère Tour, Stephan Rabitsch
Stage 2, Filippo Fortin
Stage 3, Stephan Rabitsch
Stage 2 Flèche du Sud, Filippo Fortin
Overall Paris–Arras Tour, Stephan Rabitsch
Stage 2, Stephan Rabitsch
Stage 2 Szlakiem Walk Majora Hubala, Lukas Schlemmer
Stage 4 Szlakiem Walk Majora Hubala, Filippo Fortin
Overall Oberösterreich Rundfahrt, Stephan Rabitsch
Stages 1 & 3, Stephan Rabitsch
Stage 2, Filippo Fortin
Overall Tour de Savoie Mont-Blanc, Riccardo Zoidl
Overall Czech Cycling Tour, Riccardo Zoidl
Stage 2, Riccardo Zoidl
Stage 4, Filippo Fortin
2019
Overall Rhône-Alpes Isère Tour, Matthias Krizek
2020
Stage 3 Tour of Antalya, Riccardo Zoidl
2021
Stage 1 Oberösterreich Rundfahrt, Daniel Turek
Stage 3 Circuit des Ardennes, Daniel Turek

National champions
2007
 Austria Time Trial Rupert Probst
2012
 Austria Time Trial Riccardo Zoidl
 Austria Road Race Lukas Pöstlberger
2013
 Austria Road Race Riccardo Zoidl
 Croatia Time Trial Matija Kvasina
2015
 Croatia Time Trial Matija Kvasina

References

External links

UCI Continental Teams (Europe)
Cycling teams based in Austria
Cycling teams established in 2004